Rajeev Gandhi Memorial College of Engineering and Technology (RGMCET) is an autonomous college located in Nandyal, Andhra Pradesh, India. The college is affiliated to JNTU University Anantapur and is accredited by the National Board of Accreditation. The Institute received an autonomous status in 2010. The college is approved by AICTE, India. The college was established in 1995.

External links
 Official Website
 Jntu Anantapur

All India Council for Technical Education
Educational institutions established in 1995
Universities and colleges in Nandyal
Engineering colleges in Andhra Pradesh
Jawaharlal Nehru Technological University
Universities and colleges in Kurnool district
1995 establishments in Andhra Pradesh